Biswal is an Indian surname.  Notable people with the surname include:

Nisha Desai Biswal, American diplomat
Anuradha Biswal (born 1975), Indian athlete
Chiranjib Biswal, Indian politician
Ranjib Biswal (born 1970), Indian cricketer

Indian surnames